Eslamabad (also Romanized as Eslāmābād; also known as Shāh Darān, Chāh Devānī, Shāh Darānī, Shāhderānī, and Shahdorānī) is a village in Arabkhaneh Rural District, Shusef District, Nehbandan County, South Khorasan Province, Iran. At the 2006 census, its population was 35, in 10 families.

References 

Populated places in Nehbandan County